Lee Tae-ri (born Lee Min-ho; June 28, 1993) is a South Korean actor. He is well-known for his role as young Yang Myung in Moon Embracing the Sun (2012), Song Man-bo in Rooftop Prince (2012), Jung Joo-hwan in The Beauty Inside (2018), Jinmichae/Geum Jin-mi in Extraordinary You (2019), and Imugi in Tale of the Nine Tailed (2020).

Biography

Personal life
Lee Tae-ri was born in Seoul, South Korea on June 28, 1993. His family consists of his father, mother and one older sister. He finished his high school at Paikyang High School and is currently taking up theater major in Chung-Ang University's Institute of the Arts.

Lee became an actor because it was his father's dream before but couldn't pursue it. He started playing soccer as a rebellion against his parents wish for him to pursue acting. He became the captain of his middle school's soccer team, and was awarded top score in 2008 Seoul FC Junior Championship Cup scoring 10 goals in a game. He wanted to become a professional soccer player, but eventually upon entering high school, he came to realize what acting was like and fully embraced it.

Lee Tae-ri considered using a stage name because many confused him with the City Hunter’s Lee Min-ho but his parents disapproved of the idea and said that instead of changing his name, he should work harder to be recognized.

Career
Lee started his career as a child actor. He debuted at the age of five playing the role in the 1998 sitcom Soonpoong Clinic, followed by historical dramas Empress Myeongseong and Jang Gil San.
In 2005, he starred with Yoo Seung-ho in KBS' children program Magic Warriors. He is also known for his roles in Gangnam Mom, Grudge: The Revolt of Gumiho and The Thorn Birds.

In 2012, Lee rose to fame after starring in the hit historical drama Moon Embracing the Sun. He was then cast as Song Kang-ho's rebellious son in the movie Howling. He appeared in the music video for 2BiC′s debut song I Made Another Girl Cry.

Lee followed with a supporting role in the hit romantic comedy Rooftop Prince, where he played one of the 3 member of Yoochun's character entourage. He was then cast as the son of Shin Ha-kyun's character in the action film Running Man.

In 2013, Lee played supporting roles in the historical drama The Blade and Petal, and political romantic comedy Prime Minister & I.

In 2014, he had his first lead role in the youth film, School of Youths with Bae Seul-ki. He also co-starred with Bae Noo-ri in a 4 episode web drama Teleport Lovers, produced by Korean organization K-Move! to promote overseas employment among Korean youth.

In 2015, he was cast as a high school student who gets involved in a case with his music teacher in Kwak Jae-yong's Time Renegade. The same year, he played a supporting role as Grand Prince Bongnim in  Splendid Politics.

In 2017, Lee was cast in the medical drama Hospital Ship, playing Ha Ji-won's brother. He is set to star next in the horror film, Woman's Wail.

In 2018, he started using Lee Tae-ri as his stage name and also signed up with Starhaus Entertainment. Lee was cast in the romantic comedy drama Coffee, Do Me a Favor as a musical actor; as well as the drama remake of the film The Beauty Inside.

In 2019, he was cast in Search: WWW  as Godori and in another drama named Extraordinary You which was a remake of the webtoon "July Found by Chance", Lee played the supporting role of "Jinmichae", a worker in a high school who guides the self aware students from the comical life. Lee was also cast as a Cameo in Voice (TV series).

In 2020, he was cast in Tale of the Nine Tailed as an Imoogi  who is in constant conflict with a Gumiho (nine tail fox). Lee was later cast in a high school drama True Beauty (South Korean TV series) as a cameo.

In 2021, Lee was cast as Ma Hyun-bin in Young Lady and Gentleman.

In 2022, he was cast in The King of Tears, Lee Bang-won and Bloody Heart.

Filmography

Film

Television series

Web series

Music videos

Musical theatre

Social contributions

Awards and nominations

References

External links 

 
 
 
 

1993 births
South Korean male models
South Korean male child actors
South Korean male film actors
South Korean male television actors
Living people
20th-century South Korean male actors
21st-century South Korean male actors
Chung-Ang University alumni
South Korean male musical theatre actors
South Korean male stage actors